Kumbağ  is a town in the central district (Tekirdağ)  of Tekirdağ Province, Turkey. The population of Kumbağ was 2069  as of 2011. The town was a Greek fishing village named Kumbos or Chrisampelos prior to Balkan Wars. After the Turkish War of Independence in 1920s, Greeks were replaced by the Turks from Greece and Bulgaria. In 1935s Turks from Romania also settled in Kumbağ. In 1993 it was declared a seat of township. With  sandy beaches the main revenue of the town is tourism. Farming is another major sector.

References

Populated places in Tekirdağ Province
Towns in Turkey
Populated coastal places in Turkey
Seaside resorts in Turkey
Thrace